Amblyseius begljarovi is a species of mite in the Phytoseiidae family. It was described by Abbasova in 1970.

References

begljarovi
Animals described in 1970